Destination Anywhere is Jon Bon Jovi's second solo studio album released June 16, 1997 and features music from the film Destination Anywhere released in the same year. It follows his successful 1990 soundtrack Blaze of Glory, from the film Young Guns II. 

The production and style for Destination Anywhere departs from the hard rock sound of his albums with the group Bon Jovi, such as featuring drum loops, female backing vocals and Jon Bon Jovi himself singing in a lower register in most of the tracks. Only one of his longtime bandmates, keyboardist David Bryan, contributed to the album; though Desmond Child, cowriter of hits such as "Livin' on a Prayer", plays the tuba in the song "Ugly" and is also one of the producers.

During the production of the album, the daughter of Bon Jovi's former personal manager Paul Korzilius died. "August 7, 4:15" is dedicated to Katherine Korzilius.

Reception

Commercial
The album charted at number 31 on the Billboard 200, number 6 on the Top Canadian albums chart and number two on the UK Albums Chart. The first single "Midnight in Chelsea" was Bon Jovi's highest-charting solo single in the UK, reaching number four on the UK Singles Chart. Also charting in the UK was the second single "Queen of New Orleans" at number 10 and the third single "Janie, Don't Take Your Love to Town" at number 13. The fourth single "Ugly" charted in some European countries but not in the UK. "Staring at Your Window with a Suitcase in My Hand" was released as a promo single.

Critical
AllMusic critic Stephen Thomas Erlewine described it as "a fine example of late-'90s mainstream pop" and "a breakthrough for Bon Jovi, because it is the first time he sounds like he's come to terms with adulthood." Nevertheless, he criticized the presence of fillers on the record. Chuck Eddy of Entertainment Weekly wrote: "Almost every track on Destination Anywhere could be faster, shorter, and less world-weary, but Bon Jovi's melodies feel indelible nonetheless."

Film
Destination Anywhere: The Film (also released in 1997) was produced and incorporated music and concepts from the album. It stars Jon Bon Jovi and Demi Moore as a young couple struggling with alcoholism and the death of their young child. It debuted on both MTV and VH1 in 1997 and also stars Kevin Bacon, Whoopi Goldberg, and Annabella Sciorra. Directed by Mark Pellington, it was released on DVD on April 11, 2005, and contains the film, Destination Anywhere, the EPK for the album, and five promotional videos for the singles of the album. The track "It's Just Me" also features in full during the film.

Track listing
All songs written and composed by Jon Bon Jovi, except where noted.

Limited edition

Personnel
 Jon Bon Jovi – vocals, acoustic and electric guitar, harmonica, piano
 Dean Fasano – background vocals
 Steve Lironi – acoustic & electric guitar, keyboards, synthesizer, programming loops
 Bobby Bandiera – electric & slide guitar
 Lance Quinn, Eric Bazilian, David A. Stewart & Aldo Nova – guitar
 Kurt Johnston – dobro
 David Bryan – accordion, piano
 Desmond Child – tuba
 Guy Davis – piano, Hammond B-3 organ
 Rob Hyman – Wurlitzer piano
 Jerry Cohen – organ, keyboards, slide guitar
 Alex Silva – keyboards, programming
 Terry Disley & Imogen Heap – keyboards
 Hugh McDonald – bass
 Kenny Aronoff – drums
 Andy Wright & Paul Taylor – programming
 Maxayne Lewis, Alexandra Brown, Zhana Saunders, Brigitte Bryant, Mark Hudson, Dean Fasano, Mardette Lynch and Helena Christensen – background vocals
 David Campbell, Teese Gohl – string arrangements

Production
 Producers – David A. Stewart, Stephen Lironi, Jon Bon Jovi, Desmond Child & Eric Bazilian.
 Engineers – Charles Dye, Niven Garland, Gary McGrath, Cage Gondar, Mike Malak, Lee Manning, Obie O'Brien, Andrew Roshberg, Mark Springer, J.C. Ulloa, Robert Valdez, Mike Woglom
 Mixing – Niven Garland, Jim Labinski, Marc Lane, Obie O'Brien, Mike Rew
 Mastering – George Marino

Charts

Weekly charts

Year-end charts

Certifications

References 

1997 albums
Jon Bon Jovi albums
Albums arranged by David Campbell (composer)
Albums produced by Eric Bazilian
Albums produced by Desmond Child
Albums produced by David A. Stewart
Pop albums by American artists
Mercury Records albums